Marsupipterus is a genus of prehistoric eurypterid with an uncertain classification. The genus contains one species, M. sculpturatus, from the Silurian of England.

See also 
 List of eurypterids

References 

Eurypterida
Silurian eurypterids
Fossils of Sweden
Eurypterids of Europe